Solarius  may refer to:
 Petrus Antonius Solarius (c. 1445–1493), a Swiss Italian architect
 the blue wizard in the 1982 The Flight of Dragons animated movie
 a character in Overlord and Overlord II, an emperor
 an archbishop of Strasbourg
 the lyrics dedicated to the destiny of the Armenian nation by Alexander Varbedian
 the brother of Sirius Torijano, a widely renowned Colombian violinist

See also
 Solar (disambiguation)